Zdravets is a village in the municipality of Dimitrovgrad, in Haskovo Province, in southern Bulgaria.

Etymology 
The meaning of Zdravets (Bulgarian: Здравец) is Geranium, which thrives in the east-European country of Bulgaria.

References

Villages in Haskovo Province